"Fleur de Saison" is a song in French by Émilie Simon. The title means "Seasonal Flower" in English. It is from her second studio album Végétal.

Music video
The music video for the song was directed by nObrain, that also directed the "Flowers" music video, and produced by COSA.

It shows Émilie in different sceneries, all related to flowers and plants.

Track listings

Notes

Émilie Simon songs
2006 singles
2006 songs